"Hurting Kind (I've Got My Eyes on You)" is a rock song performed by English rock singer Robert Plant, from his 1990 album Manic Nirvana. It was released as a single and reached number 45 on the UK singles chart,
number 46 on the Billboard Hot 100 and number 1 on the Billboard Mainstream Rock chart. It was Plant's fifth number 1 rock song.

The song was written by Plant and band-mates Chris Blackwell (drums and guitar), Doug Boyle (guitar), Phil Johnstone (keyboards) and Charlie Jones (bass guitar).

B-sides 
The CD single features three songs not included on Manic Nirvana, including a cover of the Remains song "Don't Look Back".

Track listing

CD single

Charts

References 

1990 singles
Robert Plant songs
Songs written by Robert Plant
Song recordings produced by Spike Stent
1990 songs
Songs written by Phil Johnstone